Krzysztof Adamczyk (born 2 February 1956 in Gdańsk, Poland) is a former football player.
He was 1980–1981 Ekstraklasa's top scorer with Legia Warsaw, when he scored 18 times. He was manager of Chornomorets between 14 March and 4 April 2007.

Adamczyk was also one of the great players of the golden  era of Larissa, the Greek team which won both the league and the Greek cup in the 1980s. His performance in the final of the Greek cup in a 4–1 victory for Larissa  was fantastic and is still remembered in Larissa today. He is one of the greatest players in the team's history and a fan favourite.

References

1956 births
Living people
Polish footballers
Poland international footballers
Polish expatriate footballers
Sportspeople from Gdańsk
Ekstraklasa players
Super League Greece players
Legia Warsaw players
Arka Gdynia players
Zawisza Bydgoszcz players
Athlitiki Enosi Larissa F.C. players
Apollon Limassol FC players
Expatriate footballers in Greece
Expatriate footballers in Cyprus

Association football midfielders
Association football forwards
Gedania 1922 Gdańsk players